Time-domain diffuse optics or time-resolved functional near-infrared spectroscopy is a branch of functional near-Infrared spectroscopy which deals with light propagation in diffusive media. There are three main approaches to diffuse optics namely continuous wave (CW), frequency domain (FD) and time-domain (TD). Biological tissue in the range of red to near-infrared wavelengths are transparent to light and can be used to probe deep layers of the tissue thus enabling various in vivo applications and clinical trials.

Physical concepts 
In this approach, a narrow pulse of light (< 100 picoseconds) is injected into the medium. The injected photons undergo multiple scattering and absorption events and the scattered photons are then collected at a certain distance from the source and the photon arrival times are recorded. The photon arrival times are converted into the histogram of the distribution of time-of-flight (DTOF) of photons or temporal point spread function. This DTOF is delayed, attenuated and broadened with respect to the injected pulse. The two main phenomena affecting photon migration in diffusive media are absorption and scattering. Scattering is caused by microscopic refractive index changes due to the structure of the media. Absorption, on the other hand, is caused by a radiative or non-radiative transfer of light energy on interaction with absorption centers such as chromophores. Both absorption and scattering are described by coefficients  and  respectively.

Multiple scattering events broaden the DTOF and the attenuation of a result of both absorption and scattering as they divert photons from the direction of the detector. Higher scattering leads to a more delayed and a broader DTOF and higher absorption reduces the amplitude and changes the slope of the tail of the DTOF. Since absorption and scattering have different effects on the DTOF, they can be extracted independently while using a single source-detector separation. Moreover, the penetration depth in TD depends solely on the photon arrival times and is independent of the source-detector separation unlike in CW approach.

The theory of light propagation in diffusive media is usually dealt with using the framework of radiative transfer theory under the multiple scattering regime. It has been demonstrated that radiative transfer equation under the diffusion approximation yields sufficiently accurate solutions for practical applications. For example, it can be applied for the semi-infinite geometry or the infinite slab geometry, using proper boundary conditions. The system is considered as a homogeneous background and an inclusion is considered as an absorption or scattering perturbation.

The time-resolved reflectance curve at a point  from the source for a semi-infinite geometry is given by

The final DTOF is a convolution of the instrument response function (IRF) of the system with the theoretical reflectance  curve.

These can then be used as biomarkers for detecting various pathologies.

Instrumentation 
Instrumentation in time-domain diffuse optics consists of three fundamental components namely, a pulsed laser source, a single photon detector and a timing electronics.

Sources 
Time-domain diffuse optical sources  must have the following characteristics; emission wavelength in the optical window i.e. between 650 and 1350 nanometre (nm); a narrow full width at half maximum (FWHM), ideally a delta function; high repetition rate (>20 MHz) and finally, sufficient laser power (>1 mW) to achieve good signal to noise ratio.

In the past bulky tunable Ti:sapphire Lasers were used. They provided a wide wavelength range of 400 nm, a narrow FWHM (< 1 ps) high average power (up to 1W) and high repetition (up to 100 MHz) frequency. However, they are bulky, expensive and take a long time for wavelength swapping.

In recent years, pulsed fiber lasers based on super continuum  generation have emerged. They provide a wide spectral range (400 to 2000 ps), typical average power of 5 to 10 W, a FWHM of < 10ps and a repetition frequency of tens of MHz. However, they are generally quite expensive and lack stability in super continuum generation and hence, have been limited in there use.

The most wide spread sources are the pulsed diode lasers. They have a FWHM of around 100 ps and repetition frequency of up to 100 MHz and an average power of about a few milliwatts. Even though they lack tunability, their low cost and compactness allows for multiple modules to be used in a single system.

Detectors 

Single photon detector used in time-domain diffuse optics require not only a high photon detection efficiency in the wavelength range of optical window, but also a large active area as well as large numerical aperture (N.A.) to maximize the overall light collection efficiency. They also require narrow timing response and a low noise background.

Traditionally, fiber coupled photomultiplier tubes (PMT) have been the detector of choice for diffuse optical measurements, thanks mainly due to the large active area, low dark count and excellent timing resolution. However, they are intrinsically bulky, prone to electromagnetic disturbances and they have a quite limited spectral sensitivity. Moreover, they require a high biasing voltage and they are quite expensive. Single photon avalanche diodes have emerged as an alternative to PMTS. They are low cost, compact and can be placed in contact, while needing a much lower biasing voltage. Also, they offer a wider spectral sensitivity and they are more robust to bursts of light. However, they have a much lower active area and hence a lower photon collection efficiency and a  larger dark count. Silicon photomultipliers (SiPM) are an arrays of SPADs with a global anode and a global cathode and hence have a larger active area while maintaining all the advantages offered by SPADs. However, they suffer from a larger dark count and a broader timing response.

Timing electronics 
The timing electronics is needed to losslessly reconstruct the histogram of the distribution of time of flight of photons. This is done by using the technique of time-correlated single photon counting (TCSPC), where the individual photon arrival times are marked with respect to a start/stop signal provided by the periodic laser cycle. These time-stamps can then be used to build up histograms of photon arrival times.

The two main types of timing electronics are based on a combination of time-to-analog converter (TAC) and an analog-to-digital converter (ADC), and time-to-digital converter (TDC), respectively. In the first case, the difference between the start and the stop signal is converted into an analog voltage signal, which is then processed by the ADC. In the second method, the delay is directly converted into a digital signal. Systems based on ADCs generally have a better timing resolution and linearity while being expensive and the capability of being integrated. TDCs, on the other hand, can be integrated into a single chip and hence are better suited in multi-channel systems. However, they have a worse timing performance and can handle much lower sustained count-rates.

Applications 
The usefulness of TD Diffuse optics lies in its ability to continually and noninvasive monitor optical properties of tissue. Making it a powerful diagnostic tool for long-term bedside monitoring in infants and adults alike. It has already been demonstrated that TD diffuse optics can be successfully applied to various biomedical applications such as cerebral monitoring, optical mammography, muscle monitoring, etc.

See also 
 Near-infrared spectroscopy
 Functional near-infrared spectroscopy
 Diffuse optical imaging
 Neuroimaging
 Functional neuroimaging

References 

Neuroimaging
Optical imaging
Spectroscopy